Eressa multigutta is a moth of the family Erebidae. It was described by Francis Walker in 1854. It is found in Tibet, Nepal, Sikkim and Myanmar.

References

 

Eressa
Moths described in 1854